Mercier is an unincorporated community in Mission Township, Brown County, Kansas, United States.

History
A post office operated in Mercier from 1897 until 1972, but it was called Germantown until 1918.

References

Further reading

External links
 Brown County maps: Current, Historic, KDOT

Unincorporated communities in Brown County, Kansas
Unincorporated communities in Kansas
1897 establishments in Kansas